The Sri Lanka dry-zone dry evergreen forests are a tropical dry broadleaf forest ecoregion of the island of Sri Lanka.

Geography

The topography is generally low, and the landscape is dotted with isolated inselbergs. The highest of these inselbergs is Ritigala (766 meters), which lies north of the Central Highlands.

Climate
The ecoregion receives 1500–2000 mm of rainfall annually. Most rain falls during the December-to-March northeast monsoon season, and it is mostly dry the rest of the year.

Flora
The ecoregion has several plant communities.
 Mixed dry evergreen forest is the most widespread plant community. Manilkara hexandra, Chloroxylon swietenia, and Drypetes sepiaria are characteristic trees, with Diospyros ebenum, Feronia limonia, Vitex altissima, Syzygium spp., and Chukrasia tabularis. In mature forests, the trees form a canopy of 13–20 meters, with sub-canopy and shrub layers. In areas of scrub and regenerating forest, Bauhinia racemosa, Pterospermum suberifolium, Cassia fistula, and Dichrostachys cinerea are typical. Acacia thorn scrub grows in disturbed areas.
 Talawa is a submontane savanna and grassland plant community, located on the eastern and southeastern slopes of the Central Highlands. Characteristic trees are Terminalia chebula, Terminalia bellirica, Pterocarpus marsupium, Butea monosperma, Careya arborea, and Anogeissus latifolia, and the characteristic shrubs Phyllanthus emblica and Zizyphus spp. Tall perennial grasses are the predominant ground vegetation, chiefly Cymbopogon nardus and Imperata cylindrica.
 Villu is a lowland grassland plant community of northeastern Sri Lanka's river floodplains. The dominant grasses are species of Cymbopogon, Eragrostis, Themeda, and Imperata.
 unique short-stature forests grow in the highest elevations of Ritigala, and are home to several endemic species.
 recently discovered unique dry canal-associated evergreen forest grow near the ancient canals of the Polonnaruwa kingdom, dominated by Vitex leucoxylon which represents half of the vegetation, and Terminalia arjuna, which is a common river forest tree, makes up only a fifth, but still holds the place as the second most common tree. other common vegetation in descending order are Margaritaria indicus, Tamilnadia uliginosa, Barringtonia acutangula and Hibiscus tiliaceus. The presence of savanna plants like Tamilnadia uliginosa and Antidesma ghaesembilla suggests origin of a now nonexistent savanna.

The Sri Lanka dry-zone dry evergreen forests are made up mostly of evergreen trees, which distinguish them from the deciduous trees that characterize most other tropical dry broadleaf forest ecoregions. The dry-zone dry evergreen forests most closely resemble the East Deccan dry evergreen forests of India's southeast coast.

Fauna
The dry-zone dry evergreen forests are home to most of the Sri Lanka's 6000 Sri Lankan elephants (Elephas maximus maximus), the island's indigenous subspecies of Asian elephant.

Protected areas
17,736 km², or 37%, of the ecoregion is in protected areas. Protected areas include:

 Angammedilla National Park
 Bundala National Park
 Flood Plains National Park
 Gal Oya National Park
 Horowpathana National Park
 Kaudulla National Park
 Kumana National Park (Yala East)
 Lahugala Kitulana National Park
 Lunugamvehera National Park
 Madhu Road National Park
 Maduru Oya National Park
 Minneriya National Park
 Pigeon Island National Park
 Ritigala Strict Nature Reserve
 Somawathiya National Park
 Udawalawe National Park
 Ussangoda National Park
 Wasgamuwa National Park
 Wilpattu National Park
 Yala National Park (Ruhuna)

See also
Deforestation in Sri Lanka

External links

References

 
Ecoregions of Sri Lanka
Indomalayan ecoregions
Tropical and subtropical dry broadleaf forests